Krškany is a village and municipality in the Levice District in the Nitra Region of Slovakia.

History
In historical records the village was first mentioned in 1242. According to the Urbarium of 1767 these noble families lived here: Disznóssy, Agardy, Horváthy, Pomothy, Zmeskál, Paulik and Krsák.

Geography
The village lies at an altitude of 180 metres and covers an area of 17.025 km². It has a population of about 732 people.

Ethnicity
The village is approximately 97% Slovak and 3% Magyar.

Facilities
The village has a public library and a soccer pitch.

References

External links
https://web.archive.org/web/20080111223415/http://www.statistics.sk/mosmis/eng/run.html 

Villages and municipalities in Levice District